Dance research is the study of dance, including dance history, ethnochoreology, dance theory, dance anthropology, and dance science.

Dance research as an academic discipline is relatively new. In 1967, the first volume of the CORD dance research annual wrote: "...One of the most serious problems in dance research is found in the fact that the literati in the field are not yet the university people".

Dance science is the scientific study of dance and dancers, as well as the practical application of scientific principles to dance, similar to sports science. Its aims are the enhancement of performance, the reduction of injury, and the improvement of well-being and health.

Organizations
Congress on Research in Dance (founded in 1965 as a Committee on Research in Dance)
Society for Ethnomusicology
Society of Dance History Scholars
Cross-Cultural Dance Resources

References

Further reading 

 Braun, Lesley Nicole. 2014. “Trading Virtue for Virtuosity: The Artistry of Kinshasa's Concert Danseuses.”       African Arts 47(4): 48-57.Castaldi, Francesca. 2006. Choreographies of African Identities: Negritude, Dance, and the National Ballet of Senegal. Urbana and Chicago: University of Illinois Press.
 Cohen, Adrienne. 2016. “Inalienable Performances, Mutable Heirlooms: Dance, Cultural Inheritance, and Political Transformation in the Republic of Guinea.” American Ethnologist 43(4): 650-662.
 Daniel, Yvonne. 1995. Rumba: Dance and Social Change in Contemporary Cuba. Bloomington: Indiana University Press.Foster, Susan Leigh. 1996. Corporealities: Dancing Knowledge Culture and Power. Edited by Susan Leigh Foster. London: Routledge.
 Dunham, Katherine. 1969. Island possessed. University of Chicago Press.
 Franko, Mark. "Dance and the political: States of exception." Dance Research Journal (2006): 3-18.
 Ross, Janice. 2015. Like a Bomb Going Off: Leonid Yakobson and Ballet as Resistance in Soviet Russia. Yale University Press.
 Schauert, Paul. 2015. Staging Ghana: Artistry and Nationalism in State Dance Ensembles. Indiana University Press.
 Wilcox, Emily. 2018. Revolutionary Bodies: Chinese Dance and the Socialist Legacy. University of California Press.